Lightwire (formerly Rural Link Limited) is an Internet service provider (ISP) based in Hamilton, New Zealand. Lightwire was born out of a University of Waikato project in 2006.

In May 2016, Lightwire purchased the broadband arm of NetSmart Ltd thus extending their service coverage into the Bay of Plenty.

See also
 Internet in New Zealand

References

Internet service providers of New Zealand
Companies based in Hamilton, New Zealand
New Zealand companies established in 2006
Telecommunications companies established in 2006